The Crawley Edge Cairns are a series of forty-two Bronze Age round barrows, cairns and clearance cairns located in a field in Crawleyside, near Stanhope, County Durham, England.

The Cairnfield
The cairnfield site lies on a gentle south-facing slope of a hill-spur in Weardale and remains in open moorland. Two of the cairns were excavated in 1977 and surveys undertaken in 1984 and 1991.

The inclusion of clearance cairns at the site is usually taken as an indication of clearance in advance of arable farming, but the Crawley Edge field unusually includes a barrow cremation mound among the cairns.

See also
 History of County Durham
 Bronze Age Britain
 Heathery Burn Cave

References

External links
Young, R. 1984. PhD Thesis – Aspects of the Prehistoric Archaeology of the Wear Valley, County Durham

Archaeological sites in County Durham
Bronze Age sites in County Durham
Stanhope, County Durham